Shah Alam is a city in Malaysia.

Shah Alam may also refer to:

People
Shah Alam I (1643–1712), seventh Mughal emperor
Shah Alam II (1728–1806), sixteenth Mughal emperor
Shah Alam (politician) (born 1973), Indian politician
Shah Alam (Bangladeshi politician) ( 1988–1991)
Shah Alam (Bangladeshi politician, born 1951)
Shah Alam (filmmaker) (born 1981), Indian social activist and documentary film maker
Shah Alam Khan (1921–2017), Indian industrialist
Mohamed Shah Alam (1962–1989), Bangladeshi sprinter
Mohammad Shah Alam (academic) (born 1951), Bangladeshi law professor

Places
Shah Alam (federal constituency), Malaysia
Shah Alam, Tank, an administrative unit in Pakistan

See also 
 Ali Shahalom (born 1992), British-Bangladeshi comedian and presenter
 
 
 Shah (disambiguation)
 Alam (disambiguation)